is a Japanese actor and model who was last affiliated with Oscar Promotion. He played the role of Akira Nijino (ToQ 6gou) in the 2014 Super Sentai TV series Ressha Sentai ToQger.

Biography
Nagahama was originally affiliated with Beside, which belonged to the office Jinggis, he worked as a model and tarento. In October 2011, he made regular appearances in the television drama Watashi no Host-chan 〜shi chi nin no host〜. In February 2013, Nagahama won the First Kai-bi Businessman & Businesswoman Contest Grand Prix, which belonged to Oscar Promotion. His special skills were street dancing and basketball, and his hobbies were surfing and golf

Filmography

TV series

Films

References

External links
 Official profile at Oscar Promotion 
 

Japanese male actors
Japanese male models
1985 births
Living people
People from Kanagawa Prefecture